is a former member of the Japanese House of Representatives for the Aichi 7th district. Yamao was a member of the Constitutional Democratic Party of Japan from 2017 to 2020. She was the policy chief of the Democratic Party and a former liberal member of the Democratic Party of Japan. She has been elected to the Japanese House of Representatives thrice. She rose to prominence by criticizing Prime Minister Shinzo Abe for not handling the issue of nursery school waiting lists. Yamao is opposed to the Trans-Pacific Partnership, saying that the deal does not protect Japan's national interests.

Political career

Entry into politics

Rise into prominence

Allegations of affair and resignation
Following allegations of an extramarital affair with Rintaro Kuramochi published in Shukan Bunshun, Yamao resigned from the Democratic Party. She denied having the affair and maintained that the allegations were false. Her resignation was viewed as an attempt to control damage within the Democratic Party, which was struggling with fledgling support at that time.

The allegations did not dent her popularity back in her home district. Although she had to run as an independent, she was able to hold her district in the election on 22 October 2017 by a narrow margin of 834 votes. Her advocacy and her status as a prominent Diet rival to Prime Minister Abe were touted as the main reasons of her high support in the district, particularly among swing voters. Her tough stance against Abe made her a constant target of right-wing campaigners. After her win, a rumor of voting fraud in the district was spread and the local election office was bombarded with calls and emails claiming that she was illegitimately elected.

Post 2017 election
Yamao applied to join the new progressive Constitutional Democratic Party after the 2017 election. The CDP did not grant her party membership straight away but allowed her to sit as independent member in the CDP caucus in the House of Representatives. Her entry application was approved on 26 December 2017. She filed a notice of withdrawal on 18 March 2020 and was accepted on 24 March 2020.

Involvement in the special mission of the Kishida Cabinet
After the assassination of Shinzo Abe on 8 July 2022, the longstanding ties between the ruling Liberal Democratic Party with the Unification Church (UC) gained huge coverage by the Japanese media and plunged the Kishida Cabinet's approval. The UC was known for their predatory fundraising, known locally as spiritual sales, which was specifically targeting Japanese people. After Prime Minister Fumio Kishida reshuffled his second cabinet, Minister of Digital Affairs Taro Kono, who was also given the special mission of consumer affairs and food safety, established the "Spiritual Sales Review Committee" to obtain suggestions from experts of cult-related frauds. Shiori Kanno was one of the eight members initially elected into the committee.

References

21st-century Japanese women politicians
21st-century Japanese politicians
Constitutional Democratic Party of Japan politicians
Democratic Party (Japan, 2016) politicians
Members of the House of Representatives (Japan)
1974 births
Living people